Alexandru Suharev (born 3 July 1970) is a former Moldovan football player.

International goal
Scores and results list Moldova's goal tally first.

Honours
Olimpia Bălți
Moldovan National Division bronze: 1994–95

Zimbru Chișinău
Moldovan National Division champion: 1995–96
Moldovan National Division silver: 1996–97

References

External links
 
 

1970 births
Living people
Moldovan footballers
Moldova international footballers
CSF Bălți players
FC Zimbru Chișinău players
FC Spartak Vladikavkaz players
FC Dnipro players
FC Dnipro-2 Dnipropetrovsk players
Maccabi Ironi Kiryat Ata F.C. players
Bnei Sakhnin F.C. players
FC Ordabasy players
Russian Premier League players
Ukrainian Premier League players
People from Balta, Ukraine
Moldovan expatriate footballers
Expatriate footballers in Russia
Expatriate footballers in Ukraine
Expatriate footballers in Israel
Expatriate footballers in Kazakhstan
Moldovan expatriate sportspeople in Russia
Moldovan expatriate sportspeople in Ukraine
Moldovan expatriate sportspeople in Israel
Moldovan expatriate sportspeople in Kazakhstan
Association football forwards
FC Chita players